Frederick Basil Chubb (8 December 1921 – 8 May 2002) was an English and Irish political scientist, author and broadcaster.

Chubb was the first chair of the new Department of Political Science at Trinity College, Dublin, and was responsible for numerous publications which became standard works for those wishing to gain insight into Irish government and politics, most notably his The Government and Politics of Ireland, which was published in four editions. He was described as the "Father of political science in Ireland" and the "virtual inventor of Irish political science".

Early life, military service and education
Basil Chubb was born in Branksome, Poole, Dorset, the second eldest of five children. The family moved to Ludgershall, Wiltshire when he was still a child and he attended Bishop Wordsworth's School. He attended Merton College, Oxford, but his education was interrupted by the onset of World War II. He joined the RAF, but was shot down and captured during a bombing raid over Leipzig on 19 February 1944. He spent 15 months as a prisoner at Stalag Luft III, a German air force prisoner of war camp which is best known for two escapes which took place there. Basil was not one of the escapers, although he had to witness the repercussions of the various escape efforts once discovered.

Before joining the RAF, Basil had met Margaret (Margot) Rafther at Oxford, and she sent him letters and books via the Red Cross to enable him to continue his studies while imprisoned. They married in 1946, following the end of the war. Also in that year, he completed his first degree in Modern History at Oxford, followed by a Masters degree from Trinity College, Dublin, a doctorate from Oxford, and a Doctor of Letters from Trinity College, Dublin. Chubb and Rafther were friends with George Orwell.

Chubb became an Irish citizen in the early 1970s.

Career
His first academic appointment was as Lecturer in Political Science at Trinity College, Dublin. This was the first full-time appointment in political science at the college, at a time when Irish politics were not discussed as an academic subject. When TCD's department of Political Science was founded, in 1960, Basil Chubb became its first chair, a post which he held until his retirement in 1991.

During his career he produced a number of books, including The Government and Politics of Ireland, which the Irish Times described as "the secular equivalent of an Irish political bible". He also held a number of public office posts, including chair of the Employer-Labour Conference (which played a crucial role in national economic policy) and chair of Comhairle na n-Ospideal (the Hospitals Council) from 1972 to 1979. He was a frequent broadcaster in the coverage of Irish political campaigns and helped demystify the topic for the general public through his television appearances during the Irish elections.

His wife Margot died in 1984. He subsequently married Orla Sheehan, with whom he had a daughter, Katie. He died on 8 May 2002, aged 80.

Books
He was the author of the following publications:
 The control of public expenditure: Financial committees of the House of Commons (1952)
 A Source Book of Irish Government (1964)
 The Government and Politics of Ireland (1970)
 The Constitution and Constitutional Change in Ireland (1978)
 The Politics of the Irish Constitution (1991)
 FIE 50: Federation of Irish Employers, 1942-92 (1992)

He also contributed to the following:
 Economic Development and Planning Readings in Irish Public Administration: Volume 1 (1969), as editor
 Parish Pump: Study of Democratic Efficiency and Local Government in Ireland (with Myles Tierney)

Legacy
The Political Studies Association of Ireland has established an annual award to recognise the best PhD thesis in honour of Basil's memory. Awarded to recognise outstanding contributions to the research of politics undertaken in Ireland, the winners include Dr Mary Brennan (UCD, 2021), Dr Alan Duggan (TCD, 2020), Dr Silja Bára Ómarsdóttir (UCC, 2019), Dr. Sean Brennan (QUB, 2018), Dr. Cathal FitzGerald (DCU, 2017), Dr. Jessica Doyle (UCD, 2016), Dr. Jennifer Carroll MacNeill (UCD, 2015), Dr. Erin Baumann (UCD, 2014), Dr. Walt Kilroy (DCU, 2013), Dr Iosif Kovras (QUB, 2012), Dr. Michael Breen (UCD, 2011), Dr. Catherine O'Rourke (Uni. Ulster, 2010), Dr. Oliver Feeney (NUIG, 2009), Dr. Brighid Brooks-Kelly (TCD, 2008), Dr. Joanne McEvoy (QUB, 2007) and Dr. Eoin O'Malley (TCD, 2006).

A Festschrift was assembled to mark the occasion of his retirement. Modern Irish Democracy: Essays in Honour of Basil Chubb by Ronald J Hill and Michael Marsh, was published in 1993.

Relations
Basil's uncle, Sir Cecil Chubb, owned Stonehenge and gave it to the British nation.

References

See also

 Stalag Luft III
 Robin Neillands, ed. 2004 The Bomber War 
 Trinity College website
 Basil Chubb, ed. 1982 The Government and Politics of Ireland  
 Tony Rennell and John Nichol The Last Escape - The Untold Story Of Allied POWs 1944-45 

1921 births
2002 deaths
British political scientists
Irish political scientists
People from Branksome, Dorset
Academics of Trinity College Dublin
People educated at Bishop Wordsworth's School
Royal Air Force personnel of World War II
Alumni of Merton College, Oxford
Alumni of Trinity College Dublin
Alumni of the University of Oxford
People from Wiltshire
Stalag Luft III prisoners of World War II
Irish broadcasters
20th-century political scientists